Monte Baldo is a mountain range in the Italian Alps, located in the provinces of Trento and Verona.  Its ridge spans mainly northeast-southwest, and is bounded from south by the highland ending at Caprino Veronese, from west by Lake Garda, from north by the valley joining Rovereto to Nago-Torbole and, from east, the Val d'Adige.

The name derives from the German Wald ("forest"); it appears for the first time in a German map in 1163. The Peace Trail (it: Sentiero della Pace), one of the most important long distance trails in Northern Italy, leads over the range. The ridge is reachable through a cable car from the nearby town of Malcesine, on the shore of Lake Garda.

Morphology 
Mount Baldo reaches its maximum elevation of 2,218 m with the Cima Valdritta, and its minimum elevation of 65 m on Lake Garda. Other prominent peaks in the range are Monte Altissimo di Nago (2,079 m), Cima del Longino (2,180 m), Cima delle Pozzette (2,132 m) and Punta Telegrafo (2,200 m).

See also
 List of Alpine peaks by prominence

References

Images

Mountain ranges of the Alps
Mountains of Veneto
Mountains of Trentino
Garda Mountains